= Baradendromia =

Inland town of ancient Bithynia

Coordinates: 40°58′54″N 30°01′34″E

Baradendromia was an inland town of ancient Bithynia inhabited during Roman times. Its name does not occur in ancient authors, but is inferred from epigraphic and other evidence.

Its site is tentatively located near Güvemler in Asiatic Turkey.
